Southside High School is one of 15 public high schools that are part of the Greenville, South Carolina County Schools System. It is the first school in South Carolina to be home to an International Baccalaureate Diploma Program.

Advanced Placement and IB Diploma Programs 
Southside is the first high school in South Carolina to offer an International Baccalaureate Diploma Program and Advanced Placement Program. Many courses taught at the school incorporate expected materials from both programs. In addition, the IB Middle Years Program was implemented during the Fall of 2006.

School activities

Sports 
 Basketball
 Football
 Soccer
 Tennis
 Cross Country
 Volleyball
 Track and Field
 Cheerleading
 Baseball 
 Softball

Extra Curricular Programs  
 Academic Team
 STEAM Team
 Speech and Debate
 Marching Band
 Symphonic Band
 Various Air Force JROTC clubs

Major accomplishments 

 1980 AA State Basketball Champions
 1990 AA State Track Runner-Up
 1991 AA State Basketball Runner-up (upper state champions)
 1992 AA State Basketball Champions
 1993 AA State Basketball Runner-Up (Upper state champions)
 1994 South Carolina Leading Forensics Chapter 
 1997 AAA State Track Champions
 1997 South Carolina Speech and Debate Champions 
 2003 AA State Champions in Forensics; Overall State Champions in Forensics
 2006 Relay For Life Most money raised by a High School
 2007 AA Upper-State Boys' Basketball Champions (27-1) season
 2008 AA State Boys' Basketball Champions
 2008 AA State Champions in Forensics; South Carolina District Tournament Sweepstakes Winner in Forensics
 2009 AA State Boys' Basketball Champions
 2009 AA State 4x4 Relay Champions
 2009 State Champions in Forensics; South Carolina Districts Tournament Sweepstakes Winner in Forensics
 2010 State Champions in Forensics
 2010 AA State Girls' Basketball Champions
 2012 AAA Boys' Basketball Upper-State Champions
 2017 AAA Boys' Basketball State Champions
 2019 AAA Boys' Cross Country Upper-State Champions
 2021 Academic Team State Champions

References

External links 
 Southside High School (Greenville, SC) website
 Greenville, SC Public Schools
 Faculty Members
 School Activities
 International Baccalaureate Organization
 Greenville News article

Public high schools in South Carolina
High schools in Greenville, South Carolina
International Baccalaureate schools in South Carolina